This is the discography of Dutch DJ Moti.

Extended plays

Charted singles

Other singles

Guest appearances

Remixes and edits

References

Notes
 A  Did not enter the Singles Top 100, but peaked on the Dutch Top 40 chart.
 B  Did not enter the Ultratop 50, but peaked on the Flemish Ultratip chart.
 C  Did not enter the Ultratop 50, but peaked on the Walloon Ultratip chart.

Sources

Discographies of Dutch artists